The Arabian Gulf Cup (Kaʾs al-Khalīj al-ʿArabī), often referred to simply as the Gulf Cup, is a biennial football competition governed by the Arab Gulf Cup Football Federation for its eight member nations. The history of the competition has also seen it held every three to four years due to political or organisational problems. The reigning champions are Iraq, having won their fourth title at the 25th edition, as hosts, held in 2023.

History
The idea for the tournament was established at the 1968 Summer Olympics, and the first Arabian Gulf Cup took place in 1970 which was won by Kuwait. Kuwait has been the most successful team in the tournament's history, winning 10 tournaments out of 25 in total, followed by Iraq with four titles, and Saudi Arabia and Qatar with three titles each. The current champions are Iraq, who defeated Oman in 2023 to win their fourth title.

Developments

A major point that helped Qatar improve the competition was the fact that Al Jazeera Sports, the leading sports channel in Western Asia, and North Africa is based in Doha. Al Jazeera Sports won broadcasting rights to the 2004, and exclusively in the 19th Arabian Gulf Cup in 2009 after a deal ending in million, and dramatically reformed the Arabian Gulf Cup by hosting numerous talk shows and documentaries, on top of filming in HD and perfecting camerawork of matches.

The tournament marked the presence of some of the most influential personalities of the football world, including FIFA President, Sepp Blatter, and UEFA president, Michel Platini. The FIFA Executive Committee has also put on their October 4, 2013 meeting agenda to hear the proposal for the Arabian Gulf Cup to be included in the international match calendar.

Political and security issues

From 1990 to 2003, Iraq was banned due to the Gulf War.  

The 21st Arabian Gulf Cup in 2013 was originally scheduled to be hosted in the city of Basra, Iraq, but was moved to Bahrain in October 2011 to ensure that Iraq could suitably host the competition in the 22nd edition.

The 22nd Arabian Gulf Cup was also shifted after concerns of preparation and security. 

Likewise, the 23rd Arabian Gulf Cup was also originally scheduled to be held in Basra, Iraq, with an official decision set to be made in February 2015. On 2 February 2015, the Iraqi Ministry of Youth announced that Iraq would not host the competition due to a financial crisis in Iraq. 

In 2017, Saudi Arabia, the United Arab Emirates and Bahrain cut diplomatic ties with Qatar. In July 2019, the AGCFF announced that the 24th edition of the Arabian Gulf Cup would be held in the Qatari capital of Doha. In October 2019, the three countries announced they would not participate in the competition. However, later in November 2019, the three countries agreed to take part and the draw for the tournament was re-made.

Results

Winners summary

Note:
An asterisk (*) beside the year in the above table means that country hosted the tournament.

Participating nations

Legend:

 #: Invitee
 Red border: Host nation
 Blank: Did not enter
 TBD: To be determined
 GS: Group stage
 SF: Semi-finalists (No third place match)
 WD: Withdrew

Note:

  was banned from the competition from 1992 to 2003.
  have not yet won the championship nor even won a single competitive game.
 There were no third place play-offs for the Arabian Gulf Cup from 2007 to 2010 and from 2017–18 onwards.

Summary 

Source:

Note: 

 1972 (Bahrain were ejected from the competition)
 1982 (Iraq withdrew from the competition)
 1990 to 2004 (Iraq withdrew from the competition)

All-time goal records
All-time goal records by Tournaments:

 reached 100 goals on 3 March 1988 vs 
 reached 200 goals on 13 January 2023 vs 
 reached 100 goals on 19 October 1996 vs 
 reached 100 goals on 16 December 2004 vs 
 reached 100 goals on 2 December 2010 vs 
 reached 100 goals on 11 January 2013 vs 
 reached 100 goals on 11 January 2013 vs 

Does not include goals from annulled or abandoned games (1972 –  games, 1982 & 1990  games)

Includes 1974 preliminary round games

Does not include penalty shoot-out goals

All-time top scorers
Updated on 4 December 2019.

Players in bold are still active

Golden boot history

Other records
 Biggest win – 8 goals
  8–0  (29 March 1976)

 Most goals in a game – 8 goals
  8–0  (29 March 1976)

 Most individual goals in a single game – 5 goals
 Majed Abdullah,  (3 April 1979 vs )
 Jassem Al Houwaidi,  (1998 vs )

 Most individual goals in a single tournament – 10 goals
 Hussein Saeed,  (1979)

See also
 U23 Gulf Championship
 U20 Gulf Championship
 U17 Gulf Championship
 Arabian Gulf Futsal Cup
 WAFF Championship
 FIFA Arab Cup

References

External links

 
 

 
Gulf Cooperation Council
Football in the Arab world
Union of Arab Football Associations competitions
Recurring sporting events established in 1970